William Garoni (July 28, 1877 – September 9, 1914) was a professional baseball player. He played for the  New York Giants of the National League in September 1899.
He is buried at Fairview Cemetery (Fairview, New Jersey).

References

1877 births
1914 deaths
Major League Baseball pitchers
Baseball players from New Jersey
New York Giants (NL) players
19th-century baseball players
Bridgeport Orators players
People from Fort Lee, New Jersey
Sportspeople from Bergen County, New Jersey
Burials at Fairview Cemetery (Fairview, New Jersey)